The men's long jump event at the 2005 Asian Athletics Championships was held in Incheon, South Korea on September 1–2.

Medalists

Results

Qualification

Final

References
Results

2005 Asian Athletics Championships
Long jump at the Asian Athletics Championships